Ungqongqoshe Wongqongqoshe is the second  studio album by South African rapper Big Zulu. It was released by Inkabi Records on 13 September 2019.

Ungqongqoshe Wongqongqoshe was certified gold and nominated for Best Hip Hop Album at the 26th South African Music Awards.

Commercial performance 

The album was certified gold in South Africa.

Accolades 
At the South African Hip Hop Awards 2019, Ungqongqoshe Wongqongqoshe was nominated for Album of the Year.

! 
|-
|2019
|Ungqongqoshe Wongqongqoshe
|Album of the Year 
|
|

Singles 
"Ama Million" was released as album's lead single featuring Cassper Nyovest and Musiholiq on 2 August 2019.

Track listing

Personnel 
Ungqongqoshe Wongqongqoshe credits adapted from Genius and All Music.
 Big Zulu – vocals, writer, executive producer 
 AB Crazy – producer (track 6)
 Beats By Bross – producer 
 Greyvooka – producer (track 2)
 Lazarus Nyashanu – composer, producer (track 3 and 7)
 Master Dee – producer (track 8)
 MBzet Da Producer – producer (track 9 and 11) 
 Kwesta – composer, featured artist
 Tru Hitz – producer  (track 5)
  Cassper Nyovest – composer, writer, featured artist (track 10)

Release history

References

 2019 albums